Orchard Farm is an unincorporated community in St. Charles County, Missouri, United States.

History 
A post office called Orchard Farm was established in 1894, and remained in operation until 1953. The community was so named on account of orchards near the original town site.

Notes

Unincorporated communities in St. Charles County, Missouri
Unincorporated communities in Missouri